Pembrokeshire College is a further education college with a campus in Haverfordwest, Pembrokeshire, in Wales.

The College provides full-time vocational education and A-level programmes for students aged 14–19 and a variety of part-time courses for adult learners and employers. The total number of enrolled students in full and part-time education is about 14,500. The College also offers NVQs and other accredited programmes, as well as the Welsh Baccalaureate Qualification. Certain courses, are funded by the Welsh Assembly Government.

The College canteen, known as 'the refectory' is franchised out to Chartwell's.

Sport
The College includes a Sports Academy that provides coaching in Football, Rugby and Netball

References

Further education colleges in Pembrokeshire
Haverfordwest